Silver Award may refer to:

Several organizations issue awards with this name:

The Silver Award (Girl Scouts of the USA)
The Silver Award (Venturing) of the Venturing program of the Boy Scouts of America
The Silver World Award of the Boy Scouts of America
A level of The Duke of Edinburgh's Award

See also
 Silver (disambiguation)
 Award (disambiguation)
 Silver medal
 Silver Star (disambiguation)
 Bronze Award (disambiguation)
 Gold Award (disambiguation)